Alan Self (born 12 July 1944) is a former Australian rules footballer who played with the South Melbourne Football Club in the Victorian Football League (VFL).

Notes

External links 

Living people
1944 births
Australian rules footballers from Victoria (Australia)
Sydney Swans players
Spotswood Football Club players